Officially, the Workers' Party of Korea (WPK)the ruling party of North Korea (Democratic People's Republic of Korea)is a communist party guided by Kimilsungism–Kimjongilism, a synthesis of the ideas of Kim Il-sung and Kim Jong-il. The party is committed to Juche, an ideology attributed to Kim Il-sung which promotes national independence and development through the efforts of the popular masses. Although Juche was originally presented as the Korean interpretation of Marxism–Leninism, the party now presents it as a freestanding philosophy. The WPK recognizes the ruling Kim family as the ultimate source of its political thought. The fourth party conference, held in 2012, amended the party rules to state that Kimilsungism–Kimjongilism was "the only guiding idea of the party". Under Kim Jong-il, who governed as chairman of the National Defence Commission, communism was steadily removed from party and state documents in favour of Songun, or military-first politics. The military, rather than the working class, was established as the base of political power. However, his successor Kim Jong-un reversed this position in 2021, replacing Songun with "people-first politics" as the party's political method and reasserting the party's commitment to communism.

The WPK maintains a leftist image, and normally sends a delegation to the International Meeting of Communist and Workers' Parties, where it has some support. The WPK's party rules say it upholds "the revolutionary principles of Marxism–Leninism". However, a number of scholars argue that the WPK's ideology is better characterized as nationalist or far-right.

Juche

Relationship to Marxism–Leninism 
Although the term "Juche" was first used in Kim Il-sung's speech (given in 1955), "On Eliminating Dogmatism and Formalism and Establishing Juche in Ideological Work", Juche did not develop as a coherent ideology until the 1960s. Similar to Stalinism, it led to the development of an unofficial (later formalized) ideological system which defends the central party leadership. Until about 1972, Juche was called a "creative application" of Marxism–Leninism and "the Marxism–Leninism of today"; Kim Il-sung was also hailed as "the greatest Marxist–Leninist of our time". However, by 1976 Juche had become a separate ideology; Kim Jong-il called it "a unique ideology, the contents and structures which cannot simply be described as Marxist–Leninist."

At the 5th Congress, Juche was elevated to the same level as Marxism–Leninism. It gained in prominence during the 1970s, and at the 6th Congress in 1980 it was recognized as the WPK's only ideology. During the following decade, Juche transformed from practical to pure ideology. On the Juche Idea, the primary text on Juche, was published in Kim Jong-il's name in 1982. Juche is, according to this study, inexorably linked with Kim Il-sung and "represents the guiding idea of the Korean Revolution... we are confronted with the honourable task of modelling the whole society on the Juche idea". In the work, Kim Jong-il says that Juche is not simply a creative application of Marxism–Leninism, but "a new era in the development of human history". The WPK's break with basic Marxist–Leninist premises is spelt out clearly in the article, "Let Us March Under the Banner of Marxism–Leninism and the Juche Idea".

Despite Juche conception as a creative application of Marxism and Leninism, some scholars argue it has little direct connection to them. Policies may be explained without a Marxist or Leninist rationale, making the identification of specific influences from these ideologies difficult. Some analysts say it is easier to connect Juche with nationalism, but not a unique form of nationalism. Although the WPK claims to be socialist-patriotic, some analysts state its socialist patriotism would be more similar to bourgeois nationalism; the chief difference is that socialist patriotism is nationalism in a socialist state. Juche developed as a reaction to foreign occupation, involvement and influence (primarily by the Chinese and Soviets) in North Korean affairs, and may be described "as a normal and healthy reaction of the Korean people to the deprivation they suffered under foreign domination." However, there is nothing uniquely Marxist or Leninist in this reaction; the primary reason for its description as "communist" is that it occurred in a self-proclaimed socialist state. The WPK (and the North Korean leadership in general) have not explained in detail how their policies are Marxist, Leninist or communist; Juche is defined as "Korean", and the others as "foreign".

Basic tenets 

Juche primary objective for North Korea is political, economic and military independence. Kim Il-sung, in his "Let Us Defend the Revolutionary Spirit of Independence, Self-reliance, and Self-defense More Thoroughly in All Fields of State Activities" speech to the Supreme People's Assembly in 1967, summarized Juche: 

The principle of political independence known as chaju is one of Juche central tenets. Juche stresses equality and mutual respect among nations, asserting that every state has the right to self-determination. In practice, the beliefs in self-determination and equal sovereignty have turned North Korea into a perceived "hermit kingdom". As interpreted by the WPK, yielding to foreign pressure or intervention would violate chaju and threaten the country's ability to defend its sovereignty. This may explain why Kim Jong-il believed that the Korean revolution would fail if North Korea became dependent on a foreign entity. In relations with fellow socialist countries China and the Soviet Union Kim Il-sung urged cooperation, mutual support and dependence, acknowledging that it was important for North Korea to learn from other countries. Despite this, he abhorred the idea that North Korea could (or should) depend on the two nations and did not want to dogmatically follow their example. Kim Il-sung said that the WPK needed to "resolutely repudiate the tendency to swallow things of others undigested or imitate them mechanically", attributing the success of North Korea on the WPK's independence in implementing policies. To ensure North Korean independence, official pronouncements stressed the need for the people to unite under the WPK and the Great Leader.

Economic independence (charip) is seen as the material basis of chaju. One of Kim Il-sung's greatest fears involved North Korean dependence on foreign aid; he believed it would threaten the country's ability to develop socialism, which only a state with a strong, independent economy could do. Charip emphasizes an independent national economy based on heavy industry; this sector, in theory, would then drive the rest of the economy. Kim Jong-il said:

Kim Il-sung considered military independence (chawi) crucial. Acknowledging that North Korea might need military support in a war against imperialist enemies, he emphasized a domestic response and summed up the party's (and state's) attitude towards military confrontation: "We do not want war, nor are we afraid of it, nor do we beg peace from the imperialists."

According to Juche, because of his consciousness man has ultimate control over himself and the ability to change the world. This differs from classical Marxism, which believes that humans depend on their relationship to the means of production more than on themselves. The Juche view of a revolution led by a Great Leader, rather than a group of knowledgeable revolutionaries, is a break from Lenin's concept of a vanguard party.

Songun 

Songun was first mentioned on 7 April 1997 in Rodong Sinmun under the headline "There Is a Victory for Socialism in the Guns and Bombs of the People's Army". Its description in the article echoed the military-centered thinking of the time: "[Songun is] the revolutionary philosophy to safeguard our own style of socialism under any circumstances". The concept was credited to Kim Jong-il, who posited that Songun was the next stage of development of Juche.

A joint editorial entitled "Our Party's Military-First Politics Will Inevitably Achieve Victory and Will Never Be Defeated" was published by Kulloja and Rodong Sinmun (the WPK's theoretical magazine and newspaper, respectively) on 16 June 1999. In it, it was stated that Songun meant "the leadership method under the principle of giving priority to the military and resolving the problems that may occur in the course of revolution and construction as well as establishing the military as the main body of the revolution in the course of achieving the total tasks of socialism". While the article often referred to "our Party", this was not a reference to the WPK but rather to the personal leadership of Kim Jong-il.

On 5 September 1998, the North Korean Constitution was revised and it made clear that the National Defence Commission, the highest military body, was the supreme body of the state. This date is considered the beginning of the Songun era.

In late 2021, Kim Jong-un declared that the "military-first" politics of Songun would be replaced by "people-first politics" guided by himself.

"Great Leader" theory 

Unlike Marxism–Leninism, which considers developments in the material conditions of production and exchange as the driving force of historical progress (known as historical materialism), Juche considers human beings in general the driving force in history. It is summarized as "the popular masses are placed in the center of everything, and the leader is the center of the masses". Juche, North Korea maintains, is a "man-centered ideology" in which "man is the master of everything and decides everything". In contrast to Marxism–Leninism, in which a people's decisions are conditioned by their relations to the means of production, Juche argues that people's decisions take consideration of, but are independent from, external factors. Just like Marxism–Leninism, Juche believes history is law-governed, but that it is only man who drives progress, stating that "the popular masses are the drivers of history". However, for the masses to be successful, they need a "Great Leader". Marxism–Leninism argues that the popular masses will lead (on the basis of their relation to production), but in North Korea the role of a Great Leader should be essential for leadership. This theory allegedly helped Kim Il-sung establish a unitary, one-man rule over North Korea.

The theory turns the Great Leader into an absolutist, supreme leader. The working class is not to think for themselves, but instead to think through the Great Leader. The Great Leader is the "top brain" (i.e. "mastermind") of the working class, meaning that he is the only legitimate representative of the working class. Class struggle can be realized only through the Great Leader and difficult tasks in general and revolutionary changes in particular can be introduced only through and by the Great Leader. In historical development, it is the Great Leader who is the leading force of the working class. The Great Leader is also a flawless and incorruptible human being who never commits mistakes, who is always benevolent and who always rules for the masses. For the Great Leader system to function, a unitary ideological system must be in place; the Ten Principles for a Monolithic Ideological System was thus introduced by Kim Jong-il for this purpose.

Kimilsungism–Kimjongilism 

Kimilsungism and the Ten Principles for the Establishment of a Monolithic Ideological System were formally introduced by Kim Jong-il in 1974. Kim Jong-il reportedly did so to strengthen his position within the WPK, taking advantage of his father's political supremacy. Kimilsungism refers to the ideas of Kim Il-sung, while the Ten Principles serve as a guide for North Korean political and social life. Kim Jong-il argued that his father's ideas had evolved and they therefore deserved their own distinct name. North Korean state media had previously described Kim Il-sung's ideas as "contemporary Marxism–Leninism"; by calling them "Kimilsungism", Kim Jong-il sought to elevate the ideas of his father to the same level of prestige as Stalinism and Maoism. Not long after the introduction of "Kimilsungism" into the North Korean lexicon, Kim Jong-il began calling for a "Kimilsungist transformation" of North Korean society.

Political analyst Lim Jae-cheon argues that there is no discernible difference between Kimilsungism and Juche, and that the two terms are interchangeable. However, in his 1976 speech "On Correctly Understanding the Originality of Kimilsungism", Kim Jong-il said that Kimilsungism comprises the "Juche idea and a far-reaching revolutionary theory and leadership method evolved from this idea". He further added that "Kimilsungism is an original idea that cannot be explained within the frameworks of Marxism–Leninism. The Juche idea, which constitutes the quintessence of Kimilsungism, is an idea newly discovered in the history of mankind". Kim Jong-il went further, stating that Marxism–Leninism had become obsolete and must be replaced by Kimilsungism:

According to analyst Shin Gi-wook, the ideas of Juche and Kimilsungism are in essence the "expressions of North Korean particularism over supposedly more universalistic Marxism–Leninism". The new terminology signalled a move from socialism to nationalism. This was evident in a speech presented by Kim Jong-il in 1982, during celebrations of his father's 70th birthday, in which he stated that love for the nation came before love for socialism. This particularism gave birth to such concepts as "A Theory of the Korean Nation as Number One" and "Socialism of Our Style".

Following the death of Kim Jong-il in December 2011, Kimilsungism became Kimilsungism–Kimjongilism at the 4th Conference of the Workers' Party of Korea in April 2012. Party members at the conference also stated that the WPK was "the party of Kim Il-sung and Kim Jong-il" and declared Kimilsungism–Kimjongilism "the only guiding idea of the party". Afterwards, the Korean Central News Agency (KCNA) stated that "the Korean people have long called the revolutionary policies ideas of the President [Kim Il-sung] and Kim Jong-il as Kimilsungism–Kimjongilism and recognized it as the guiding of the nation". Kim Jong-un, the son of Kim Jong-il who succeeded him as leader of the WPK, said:

Kimjongunism 
In late 2021, South Korea's National Intelligence Service (NIS) reported to the country's legislature that Kim Jong-un had begun using the neologism "Kimjongunism" to promote his own ideas and importance as opposed to those of his father and grandfather. Prior to the briefing by the NIS, Kim Jong-un had made several moves to cement his political primacy, including appointing himself general secretary of the WPK (a title previously reserved as a posthumous designation for Kim Jong-il), removing portraits of his father and grandfather from important party buildings (such as the interior of the April 25 House of Culture), and adding the term "Kim Jong-un's Revolutionary Thought" to the party rules. A number of South Korean and Western political analysts argue that these actions indicated Kim Jong-un's desire to form his own legacy, separate from that of his predecessors. Major elements of Kim Jong-un's ideological shift include his emphasis on North Korea's nuclear weapons program and his reassertion of the WPK's commitment to communism.

Nationalism 

Karl Marx and Friedrich Engels did not clarify the differences which existed between states and laws; instead, they focused on the class divisions which existed within nations. They argued that nations and laws (as they then existed) would be overthrown and replaced with proletarian rule. This was the mainstream view of Soviet theoreticians during the 1920s; however, with Stalin at the helm in 1929, it was under attack. He criticized Nikolai Bukharin's position that the proletariat was hostile to the inclinations of the state, arguing that since the state (the Soviet Union) was in transition from capitalism to socialism the relationship between the state and the proletariat was harmonious. By 1936, Stalin argued that the state would still exist even if the Soviet Union reached the communist mode of production, so long as the socialist world was encircled by capitalist forces. Kim Il-sung took this position to its logical conclusion, arguing that the state would exist after North Korea reached the communist mode of production until a future world revolution. As long as capitalism survived, even if the socialist world was predominant, North Korea could still be threatened by the restoration of capitalism.

The revival of the term "state" in the Soviet Union under Stalin led to the revival of the term "nation" in North Korea under Kim Il-sung. Despite official assertions that the Soviet Union was based on "class" rather than "state", the latter was revived during the 1930s. In 1955, Kim Il-sung expressed a similar view in his speech, "On Eliminating Dogmatism and Formalism and Establishing Juche in Ideological Work": 
From then on, he and the WPK stressed the roles of "revolutionary tradition" and Korea's cultural tradition in its revolution. At party meetings, members and cadres learned about North Korea's national prestige and coming rejuvenation. Traditional customs were revived, to showcase Korean-ness. By 1965, Kim Il-sung stated that if communists continued to oppose individuality and sovereignty, the movement would be threatened by dogmatism and revisionism. He criticized those communists who, he believed, subscribed to "national nihilism by praising all things foreign and vilifying all things national" and tried to impose foreign models on their own countries. By the 1960s, Juche was a full-fledged ideology which called for the pursuance of a distinct path for North Korean socialist construction without any interference in North Korea's affairs; however, a decade later, it was defined as a system whose "fundamental principle was the realization of sovereignty".

WPK theoreticians were initially against the use of the terms "nation" and "nationalism" because of the influence of the Stalinist definition of a "state" ("a stable, historically formed community of people based on a common language, territory, economic life, and culture"); however, by the 1970s, their definition of a state had expanded to include "a community of people with a shared bloodline". During the 1980s, a common economic life was removed from the definition, with "a shared bloodline" receiving increased emphasis. In response to the democratic transition in South Korea and the dissolution of the Soviet Union, the WPK revised the meaning of nationalism. Previously defined in Stalinist terms as a bourgeois weapon to exploit the workers, nationalism was changed from a reactionary to a progressive idea. Kim Il-sung differentiated "nationalism" from what he called "genuine nationalism"; while genuine nationalism was a progressive idea, nationalism remained reactionary:

Allegations of xenophobia and racism 

During the 1960s, the WPK began to force ethnic Koreans to divorce their European spouses (who were primarily from the Eastern Bloc), with a high-ranking WPK official calling the marriages "a crime against the Korean race" and, in response, Eastern Bloc embassies in the country began to accuse the regime of practicing fascism. In May 1963, a Soviet diplomat described Kim Il-sung's political circle as a "political Gestapo". Similar remarks were made by other Eastern Bloc officials in North Korea, with the East German ambassador calling the policy "Goebbelsian" (a reference to Joseph Goebbels, Hitler's minister of propaganda). Although this was said during a nadir in relations between North Korea and the Eastern Bloc, it illustrated a perception of racism in Kim Il-sung's policies.

In his book The Cleanest Race (2010), Brian Reynolds Myers dismisses the idea that Juche is North Korea's leading ideology. He believes that the WPK's public exaltation of Juche is designed to deceive foreigners; it exists to be praised rather than followed. Myers writes that Juche is a sham ideology, developed to extol Kim Il-sung as a political thinker comparable to Mao Zedong. According to Myers, North Korean military-first policy, racism and xenophobia (exemplified by race-based incidents such as the attempted lynching of black Cuban diplomats and forced abortions for North Korean women pregnant with ethnic Chinese children) indicate a base in far-right politics (inherited from Imperial Japan during its colonial occupation of Korea) rather than the far-left.

North Korean class analysis 

Unlike the Joseon dynasty, where there was a huge gap between the upper and lower classes, the North Korean government developed the concept of a gathered-together "people". Instead of a strict social hierarchy, the North Korean government divided the country's population into three classesthe industrial workers, the peasants, and the samuwonNorth Korea is a society in which all three classes are considered equally important. The samuwon class consists of the intelligentsia and the petite bourgeoisie, such as clerks, small traders, bureaucrats, professors and writers. This class is unique to North Korean class analysis and it was conceptualized in order to increase the rates of education and literacy among the country's population.

Normally, Marxist–Leninist states would only value the farmers or the labourers, thus, in the Soviet Union, the intelligentsia was not defined as an independent class of its own. Instead, it was defined as a "social stratum" that recruited itself from members of almost all classes: the proletariat, the petite bourgeoisie and the bourgeoisie. However, a "peasant intelligentsia" was never mentioned. Correspondingly, the "proletarian intelligentsia" was exalted because it consisted of progressive scientists and communist theoreticians, but the "bourgeois intelligentsia" was condemned for producing "bourgeois ideologies", i.e. non-Marxist–Leninist worldviews.

North Koreans believed in achieving rapid industrialization through labour and by subjecting nature to human will. By restructuring social classes into a mass of people who are all theoretically equal, the North Korean government claimed that it would be able to attain self-reliance in upcoming years. However, this assertion has been questioned by foreign observers because the country suffers from massive food shortages annually and it is heavily dependent on foreign aid as a result.

Socialism of Our Style 
"Socialism of Our Style", also referred to as "Korean-style socialism" and "our-style socialism" within North Korea, is an ideological concept Kim Jong-il introduced on 27 December 1990 in the speech "Socialism of Our Country is a Socialism of Our Style as Embodied by the Juche Idea". Speaking after the Revolutions of 1989 that brought down the Eastern Bloc countries, Kim Jong-il explicitly stated that North Korea neededand survived because ofSocialism of Our Style. He argued that socialism in Eastern Europe failed because they "imitated the Soviet experience in a mechanical manner". According to Kim, they failed to understand that the Soviet experience was based on specific historical and social circumstances and could not be used by other countries aside from the Soviet Union itself. He added that "if experience is considered absolute and accepted dogmatically it is impossible to build Socialism properly, as the times change and the specific situation of each country is different from another". Kim Jong-il went on to criticize "dogmatic application" of Marxism–Leninism, stating:

North Korea would not encounter such difficulties because of the conceiving of Juche. In his words, North Korea was "a backward, colonial semifeudal society" when the communists took over, but since the North Korean communists did not accept Marxism, which was based on European experiences with capitalism, or Leninism, which was based on Russia's experience, they conceived of Juche. He believed that the situation in North Korea was more complex because of the American presence in nearby South Korea. Thanks to Kim Il-sung, Kim Jong-il argued, the revolution had "put forward original lines and policies suited to our people's aspirations and the specific situation of our country". "The Juche idea is a revolutionary theory which occupies the highest stage of development of the revolutionary ideology of the working class", Kim Jong-il said, further stating that the originality and superiority of the Juche idea defined and strengthened Korean socialism. He then conceded by stating that Socialism of Our Style was "a man-centered Socialism", explicitly making a break with basic Marxist–Leninist thought, which argues that material forces are the driving force of historical progress, not people. Socialism of Our Style was presented as an organic sociopolitical theory, using the language of Marxism–Leninism, saying:

See also 
 Ideology of the Chinese Communist Party
 Ideology of the Communist Party of the Soviet Union

References

Citations

Sources

Books

Journal articles

News and magazine articles

Other